Maarat al-Numaan District is a district of the Idlib Governorate in northwestern Syria. The administrative centre is the city of Maarat al-Numan. At the 2004 census, the district had a population of 371,829.

Sub-districts
The district of Maarat al-Numaan is divided into six sub-districts or nawāḥī (population as of 2004):
Ma'arrat al-Nu'man Subdistrict (ناحية معرة النعمان): population 149,834.
Khan Shaykhun Subdistrict (ناحية خان شيخون): population 34,371.
Sinjar Subdistrict (ناحية سنجار): population 33,721.
Kafr Nabl Subdistrict (ناحية كفر نبل): population 67,460.
Al-Tamanah Subdistrict (ناحية التمانعة): population 29,114.
Hish Subdistrict  (ناحية حيش): population 41,231.

References

External links
 

Maarat al-Numan District
Districts of Idlib Governorate